Hollai, Hollay is Hungarian surname:

 Camilla von Hollay (1899 - 1967), a Hungarian film actress of the silent era
 Imre Hollai (1925-2017), a Hungarian politician

See also 

 Holló

Hungarian-language surnames